Karridene is a small resort in KwaZulu-Natal, South Africa. It is now part of eThekwini. Seaside resort at the mouth of the Umzimbaza River, 37 km south-west of Durban, between Illovo Beach and Umkomaas.

History
Named after Lieutenant-Colonel Walter Karri-Davis, a mining magnate and owner of the ground where it was laid out.

See also
Black December

References

Populated places in eThekwini Metropolitan Municipality